The Harmar campaign was an attempt by the United States Army to subdue confederated Native Americans nations in the Northwest Territory that were seen as hostile in Autumn 1790. The campaign was led by General Josiah Harmar and is considered a significant campaign of the Northwest Indian War. The campaign ended with a series of battles on 19–21 October 1790 near the Miami villages of Kekionga. These were all overwhelming victories for the Native Americans and are sometimes collectively referred to as Harmar's Defeat.

Background

From 1784 to 1789, there was considerable violence between encroaching American settlers and the Shawnee and Miami Indians in Kentucky, along the Ohio River, and at the few American settlements north of the Ohio, with some 1,500 settlers killed by the Indians. However, there was no general war. Before the American Revolutionary War, the British had tried to preserve this area as a Native American reserve, they were forced to cede what became known as the Northwest Territory when the United States gained independence. American settlers were eager to enter these lands and started to do so.

United States Secretary of War Henry Knox at first resisted calls for military action against the resident Native American nations, fearing it would lead to even more conflicts.  In 1789, President George Washington wrote to Arthur St. Clair, governor of the Northwest Territory (an entity not recognized by its Native inhabitants), and asked him to determine whether the Indians living along the Wabash and Illinois Rivers were "inclined for war or peace" with the United States.  St. Clair decided the tribes "wanted war," and called for militia forces to be assembled at Fort Washington (now Cincinnati, Ohio) and Vincennes, Indiana. Washington and Knox ordered General Josiah Harmar to lead these forces on a punitive expedition into the Shawnee and Miami lands as retaliation for the killings of American settlers and travelers on the contested frontier, and to deter the tribes from further attacks.

In early 1790, emissaries from the United States sent word that St. Clair wished to discuss peace with the Native Americans at Vincennes. These were generally not well received and reinforced St. Clair's decision to launch an attack. American Indian attacks continued throughout the summer, but just before the campaign was to launch, a party of Miami and Potawatomi representatives arrived at Vincennes to discuss peace.  Major Jean François Hamtramck, the commandant at Vincennes, sent them away, telling them they must first return all prisoners.     

The primary objective of the Harmar campaign was the destruction of the Native villages located near the large Miami town of Kekionga (present-day Fort Wayne, Indiana), where the St. Joseph and St. Mary's rivers join to form the Maumee River. St. Clair and Harmar also planned to build a fort there. But when St. Clair presented his plan to Washington at New York in August 1790, the president decided that a fort would be too vulnerable and too expensive.  British forces still occupied Fort Detroit, in violation of the Treaty of Paris. St. Clair wrote to the British at Fort Detroit to assure them that the expedition was against only Indian tribes and expressed his confidence that the British would not interfere.

Campaign begins
General Harmar gathered 320 regulars of the First American Regiment (organized into two battalions commanded by Major John Doughty and Major John Wyllys) and 1,133 militia from Kentucky and Pennsylvania, for a total of 1,453 men. The force also had a battery of three horse-drawn 6-pounder cannon. The campaign was launched from Fort Washington on 7 October 1790, when General Harmar began the march north along the Great Miami River.

A smaller force led by Major Hamtramck marched north from Vincennes at the same time. Hamtramck commanded 330 soldiers of the First American Regiment and militia from Virginia. He was to distract the Wabash Indians from the main force and then join Harmar for the main attack. Hamtramck's force burned a few villages over 11 days but was delayed when the militia refused to continue. Hamtramck returned to Vincennes instead of joining Harmar, who, by 13 October, had marched to within a half day's ride of Kekionga. That day, Kentucky patrols had captured a Shawnee scout who—after some intense interrogation—said that the Miami and Shawnee had decided to evacuate their towns rather than fight.

The residents of Kekionga and the surrounding villages had little time to prepare for the invasion and thus decided to evacuate. Before dawn on 15 October, Harmar dispatched 600 men under Colonel John Hardin in hopes of surprising the Indians at Kekionga before they could finish evacuating.  When Hardin's detachment reached Kekionga, they found the village abandoned. They burned it together with any stores they found and camped south of the destroyed town.

Harmar reached other Miami villages near Kekionga on 17 October. The Miami had warning of the attack and had evacuated their villages with as much food as they could carry. Some British-affiliated traders had been living among the Miami; they fled to Fort Detroit with their families and goods. They had distributed all available arms and ammunition to Miami warriors. The Miami were well informed of the size and movements of Harmar's force and had learned of Harmar's inclination toward drunkenness. The Americans seized the food left behind by the Miami. On the morning of 18 October, a mounted patrol under Lieutenant Colonel James Trotter rode towards the Kickapoo towns looking for the people who have fled their towns. The patrol found, chased, and killed two Native Americans. A member of the patrol became separated and accidentally discovered a large war party, but after reporting this to Trotter, the patrol failed to locate them before returning to camp.  Annoyed, Hardin received permission to lead a similar reconnaissance patrol the following day.

Battles

Hardin's defeat
On 19 October, Harmar moved his main force to the Shawnee town of Chillicothe, two miles east of Kekionga on the Maumee River. Harmar sent out a scouting party under Colonel Hardin, who led his patrol south of modern Churubusco, Indiana. The force consisted of 180 militia, a troop of cavalry under Major James Fontaine, and 30 regulars under Captain John Armstrong. The objective was to estimate the strength of the Indians and attack the village of Chief Le Gris. The party came within a few miles of Kekionga, where they encountered an Indian on horseback, who fled along a minor trail leading away from the village. Hardin ordered his force to pursue but sent Major Fontaine's cavalry back to bring up Captain William Faulkner's company, which had been left behind. The Indian was a decoy and led Hardin into a swampy lowland bordered by fallen trees and the Eel River 13 miles northwest of Kekionga, where the horses could neither pursue nor easily retreat.

The militia was stretched out nearly a half mile when Hardin, at the head of the column, rode into the meadow. The meadow was near the village of Little Turtle, who had baited it with trinkets and goods. The militia gathered around a burning fire and began to collect the items when they were ambushed. The first volley came from the militia's right, killing several militia members, including the son of Kentucky General Charles Scott. The U.S. force moved away to their left, where they were met with more fire at point-blank range.

Captain Armstrong formed a line of 30 regulars and 8 militia, but most of the force fled past his line. Another infantry company to the rear refused to join the battle. After the U.S. line fired one round from their muskets, the Native force—mostly Miami with some Shawnee and Potawatomi—charged with handheld weapons. Only 8 of the 30 regulars survived, including Captain Armstrong, who hid in the marsh, and Ensign Asa Hartshorne, who hid beneath a log. Major Fontaine encountered the fleeing militia, along with Captain Faulkner's missing company. They formed a new line, which Colonel Hardin joined. They spotted a few Miami warriors who halted their pursuit and held the line until they believed there were no more fleeing militia. They then returned to the main encampment, where they estimated that 40 militia were killed and 12 wounded. 

Captain Armstrong arrived in camp the next morning. He blamed Hardin and the militia for the defeat and claimed that only about 100 Indians had been involved. This was the approximate number of warriors available from Kekionga and Le Gris' village. General Harmar refused Hardin's request to return to the battle site. Instead, he insisted that the army complete their mission of destroying villages and prepare to return to Fort Washington.  The 19 October battle is sometimes referred to as Hardin's defeat.

Battle of Kekionga 

On 21 October, Harmar announced that their objective was complete and ordered his forces to begin their withdrawal to Fort Washington. They marched about eight miles and made camp at the same site they had used on 16 October. That evening, scouts arrived in camp and reported that about 120 Native Americans had returned to Kekionga. The number may have been higher, as Shawnee, Miami, Lenape, Odawa, and Sauk streamed into the town.

Eager to retaliate for their earlier losses, and hoping to discourage the Native Americans from attacking the return march, Harmar organized a force under the command of Major Wyllys. The force consisted of 60 regulars, 40 mounted soldiers under Major Fontaine, and 400 militia under Colonel Hardin and Major Horatio Hall. Wyllys' force departed at 2:00 AM on 22 October. At dawn, it paused on the Maumee River and divided into four detachments led by Wyllys, Fontaine, Hall, and Hardin. Hardin and Hall moved to the west, south of the Native American towns, to establish positions on the western bank of the St. Joseph River. Wyllys, Fontaine, and Major James McMullan crossed the Maumee, planning to frighten the Indians so that they would cross the St. Joseph, where Hardin and Hall would be waiting for them.

The militias under Hardin and Hall found American Indians while approaching their position. It is unclear who fired first, but the sound alarmed those who were in Kekionga. Wyllys ordered a full attack, but warriors hiding on the opposite bank attacked while his force was crossing. Fontaine led a cavalry charge into the wooded area and was killed, perhaps because his own men failed to join the charge. Fontaine's leaderless force withdrew. Once Wyllys and McMullan regrouped, they were harassed by small parties who fired on the militia and then retreated. McMullan's militia took the bait, drifting to the north until the regulars under Wyllys were left isolated. After a brief exchange of fire, they were trapped and forced to fight in the open at close range, with results as devastating as on 19 October. Survivors fled across the St. Joseph to join the U.S. detachments under Hardin. The Shawnee and Miami attacked Hardin from three sides. Expecting reinforcements from Harmar, Hardin defended his position for over three hours before finally falling back to join the rest of the army.

Hall, meanwhile, crossed the St. Joseph to the north, and joined up with McMullan. They marched together to Kekionga and prepared for another engagement, but finding it quiet, they returned to join the main force under General Harmar.  Both Hardin and Hall met with Kentucky Major James Ray, just 3 miles from camp. Harmar had sent Ray to assist in the battle, along with the only 30 men willing to go. In this battle, sometimes known as Harmar's defeat by the Americans, 180 American men were either killed or wounded. The army forces reported 129 men killed in action (14 officers, including Wyllys and Fontaine, and 115 enlisted men) and 94 wounded (including 50 of the regulars). Estimates of Indian casualties range from 120 to 150.

Aftermath 
After such high casualties from these engagements, General Harmar determined that he could not attack again. The approaching winter further threatened his command, as militia deserted and horses starved. The retreating force reached Fort Washington on 3 November . Native American leaders considered a final, decisive blow to Harmar's retreating forces, but the Odawa reportedly departed for home, interpreting a lunar eclipse as a sign that they should not attack. Their homes and food stores stolen or destroyed, refugees would rely on surviving villages to survive that winter. Important Miami artifacts were also lost in the evacuation, destroying history and culture that has never been recovered. Following the attacks, the Native American confederacy moved their center away from Kekionga to the Auglaize River.

Harmar's losses were the worst defeat of U.S. forces by Indians up to that time. It was surpassed by St. Clair's defeat in 1791 and the Battle of the Little Bighorn in the late 19th century in the West. Little Turtle became established as an Indian hero, and the Indians in the Northwest Territory were emboldened to continue to resist the United States. Although the campaign was intended to pacify American Indian nations, Harmar's defeat led to increased attacks on U.S. settlements all across the Northwest Territory, both out of revenge and to replace the crops destroyed by Harmar. These attacks including the January 1791 Big Bottom massacre and Siege of Dunlap's Station.

President Washington was furious at the news of the defeat and lamented "my mind... is prepared for the worst; that is, for expence without honor or profit." He and St. Clair feared that the campaign would embolden the confederacy. Senator William Maclay accused the administration of starting a war without the authorization of Congress, perhaps as an excuse to raise a standing army. That December, General Von Steuben wrote to Alexander Hamilton, lamenting the loss of Major Wyllys and expressing fear for Major Hamtramck.  "This war is not over, it is only the Commencement of the Hostilities, so will we never learn to be wise that by force of stupidity?"

A court-martial in 1791 cleared Harmar of any wrongdoing during the campaign. Despite the heavy losses, Harmar considered his main objective accomplished. Five villages had been destroyed by evacuating villagers or by his army, and tens of thousands of bushels of grain had been taken or destroyed. Nevertheless, John Cleves Symmes said the panic caused by the tactical Native victory would discourage new settlers from moving to the Ohio territory.

Because they were both present when Harmar's army arrived, this was the first full military operation shared between Miami leader Little Turtle and Shawnee leader Blue Jacket. William Wells reported that Little Turtle led the defense against Hardin, while Blue Jacket led the Shawnee, Buckongahelas the Delaware, and Egushawa the Odawa. Wells, who was Little Turtle's son-in-law, later claimed that Little Turtle was in overall command; but Wayne and Wilkinson both believed that Blue Jacket was in overall command. Learning of the defeats, Congress raised a second regiment of regular soldiers for six months, but it later reduced the soldiers' pay. The First Regiment was reduced to 299 soldiers, while the new Second Regiment recruited only half of their authorized number. When Governor St. Clair led a similar expedition the next year, he had to call out the militia to meet the required manpower.

Analysis 
Historical analysis of the Harmar campaign has been difficult.  Eyewitness accounts contradict one another on key points, and Native American accounts are not well documented. A great deal of mistrust was present between the U.S. regulars and the militia. Knox had hoped that veteran frontier fighters from Pennsylvania and Kentucky would join the campaign, but notable militia leaders refused to participate, and enlisted pay was very low, especially during the harvest season when militia members were needed at home. Few experienced frontiersmen took part in the campaign; many instead paid recent immigrants to take their place. Lieutenant Ebenezer Denny wrote that the militia "appear to be raw and unused to the gun or the woods," and many arrived unfit for duty or unarmed. The troops were assembled in September, and the campaign had to be completed before winter set in, or the pack horses which carried the troops' supplies would starve for lack of grazing vegetation. The Army had no time to train the militia before the start of the campaign. Harmar viewed the militia with contempt, and the militia reciprocated by accusing Harmar of drunkenness, cowardice, and incompetence.

The U.S. force under Harmar had considerable trouble moving through the woodlands.  There were no suitable roads, and the army lost a third of their packhorses through negligence or theft. The contracts provided compensation for the horse owners, such that the loss of an animal could be profitable. Major Hamtramck's western wing had been forced to turn back, and he thought his mission had been a failure. However, he later learned that a force of 600 warriors had been assembled to challenge him. Since his primary mission was to divert attention away from Harmar's main force, his mission had arguably been accomplished.

References

Notes

Citations

Sources

External links

 Ohio History Central
 Historical Marker Database - Hardin's Defeat
 Historical Marker Database - Battle of Kekionga
 Defending A New Nation 1783–1811 by John R. Maass (Center of Military History United States Army)

1790 in the Northwest Territory
Battles of the Northwest Indian War
Battles in Indiana
Indiana in the Northwest Indian War
Pre-statehood history of Ohio
Military history of the United States